Pseudochromis dixurus, the fork-tail dottyback, is a species of ray-finned fish 
found in the Red Sea and the Indian Ocean which is a member of the family Pseudochromidae.

References

dixurus
Taxa named by Roger Lubbock
Fish described in 1975
Fish of the Red Sea
Fish of the Indian Ocean